The Oxford History of Early Modern Europe comprises a series of self-contained monographs, usually addressing an individual country or theme.

Books
The Dutch Republic: Its Rise, Greatness, and Fall 1477-1806 (1995) by Jonathan Israel
Contested Island: Ireland 1460-1630 (2007) by S.J. Connolly 
Divided Kingdom: Ireland 1630-1800 (2008) by S.J. Connolly
Germany and the Holy Roman Empire, Volume I: Maximilian I to the Peace of Westphalia, 1493-1648 (2012) by Joachim Whaley
Germany and the Holy Roman Empire, Volume II: The Peace of Westphalia to the Dissolution of the Reich, 1648-1806 (2012) by Joachim Whaley
The Oxford History of Poland-Lithuania, Volume I: The Making of the Polish-Lithuanian Union, 1385-1569 (2015) by Robert I. Frost
The Russian Empire 1450-1801 (2017) by Nancy Shields Kollmann

References

External links
 Oxford History of Early Modern Europe

Oxford
Historiography of Europe
Oxford University Press books